Okeus (also known as Okee) was a wrathful god in the religion of the Powhatan and Monocan tribes of Virginia,the vengeful counterpart of the god Ahone, whom the Powhatan associated with war. Okeus was mistakenly labelled as the devil by European colonists and missionaries who misinterpreted Powhatan deities,spiritual practices, and depictions in art, among them John Smith. Okeus was believed to be a wrathful god who required propitiation. Temples devoted to Okeus were known as Quioccosan. Powhatan spirituality was polytheistic and Okeus was believed to be the most important deity in their pantheon, a guardian who could bring illness, crop failure, and other disasters to the Powhatan if not appeased. Powhatan priests attempted to intercede with Okeus and other deities to cure diseases and bring rain.
Image: Effigy, Okeus/Okie provided by amateur archeologist and Native American researcher J.W.Bopp. 

Artifact discovered in Orange County, Virginia
September 2022.

See also
 List of Native American deities

References

Gods of the indigenous peoples of North America
Nanticoke tribe
Native American demons
Powhatan Confederacy